Islam Qala is a district in Herat Province, Afghanistan.

References 

Districts of Herat Province